Karl Arne Fredrik Emvall (born June 28, 1976) is a Swedish former professional ice hockey player. He played most of his career as a forward in Linköpings HC, where he's been alternate captain (2003–2007) and even captain for one season (2007–2008).

Emvall announced his retirement on May 6, 2010. He served as the general manager for Linköpings HC from the 2014–15 season through to the 2018–19 season.

External links

1976 births
Living people
Linköping HC players
Swedish ice hockey left wingers
Tingsryds AIF players
People from Växjö
Sportspeople from Kronoberg County